Premi Vishwanath is an Indian television actress from Kerala who predominantly appears in Malayalam and Telugu television Shows and films. She is known for her role as Karthika/Karthu in the soap opera Karuthamuthu, which premiered on Asianet and also by portraying Deepa in the Telugu serial  Karthika Deepam on Star Maa.

Acting career
Premi Viswanath is now doing a Telugu serial in Star maa TV, Karthika Deepam, released on 16 October 2017. Premi Viswanath began her career as an actress in the serial Karuthamuthu on the Asianet; Through the portrayal of a dark-skinned girl in television, she broke all conventional concepts in Malayalam television history and Karthu became a well-known household name. Asianet. Viswanath is a Malayalam television actress who plays the female lead in the Karuthamuthu serial (Karthika a.k.a Karthu), which was also produced by Bros Creations, also airing on the Asianet channel from Monday through Saturday. Viswanath won the best female actress (new face) in the 2014 Asianet Film Awards night at the Karuthamuthu series. Another series Premi stars in is one of the popular ongoing series Flowers (TV series) channel. The name of the character is Mayilamma. Premi Vishwanath hosted a number television shows on Malayalam channels, mainly Flowers' and Kuttikalavara program on the Flowers (TV series) channel. She is a relative of actor Jayasurya.

Films

Television

Special appearances

Awards

References

External links 

Living people
Actresses from Kochi
21st-century Indian actresses
Actresses in Malayalam television
Indian television actresses
Actresses in Telugu television
Year of birth missing (living people)